This article shows the 2014 season of South Korean football.

FIFA World Cup

National team results

Senior team

Under-23 team

K League

K League Classic

K League Challenge

Promotion-relegation playoffs
The promotion-relegation playoffs were held between the winners of the 2014 K League Challenge playoffs and the 11th-placed club of the 2014 K League Classic. The winners on aggregate score after both matches earned entry into the 2015 K League Classic.

Gwangju FC won 4–2 on aggregate and were promoted to the K League Classic, while Gyeongnam FC were relegated to the K League Challenge.

Korean FA Cup

Final

Korea National League

Championship playoff

WK League

Table

Playoff and championship
The playoff is played one leg and championship final is played over two legs.

AFC Champions League

South Korean clubs' score displayed first

See also
Football in South Korea

References

External links

 
Seasons in South Korean football